Prestige Golfshire is a mixed development from Prestige Group consisting of a golf course and independent mansions which is located at Nandi Hills, Bangalore, India. This development is spread over an area of 275 acres which has independent mansions, golf course & Club, Marriott Hotels & Resorts, convention centre and lake.

Golfshire Club
Prestige Golfshire Club, is managed by Troon Golf. This 18-hole championship Golfcourse designed by Bob Hunt of PGA Design Consulting is in Semi-Private resort style. Club also features a Wellness Zone, Swimming Pool, Squash Courts and Falcon Greens Restaurant & Bar.

Golfing Events & Tournaments
 Bangalore's Anirban Lahiri, along with other 20 top-ranked PGTI players, participated in the first Pro-Am Golf Tournament held at Golfshire Club on 11 March 2012.
Callaway Golf India & Prestige Golfshire hosted Callaway RAZR Fit Challenge and Shiv Kapur, one of India's top golfers launched the RAZR fit.

Location 
Prestige Golfshire is located in the foothills of Nandi Hills on  the edge of Lake Karehalli. On a clear day, Nandi Hill is clearly visible from this property.

Awards and recognition
Asia Pacific Property Awards 2011 -Highly Commended Golf Course India
Asia Pacific Property Awards 2011 -Highly Commended Golf Development India
Cityscape Awards 2009 – Best Mixed Use Development – Future
CNBC Asia Pacific Commercial Property Award 2009 – Best Golf Development India

References

Golf clubs and courses in India
Bangalore
2011 establishments in Karnataka
Sports venues completed in 2011